Miloš Karadaglić (Serbian Cyrillic: Милош Карадаглић, born 23 April 1983), sometimes known just by his mononym Miloš, is a classical guitarist and Deutsche Grammophon/Mercury Classics recording artist from Montenegro.

Biography

Karadaglić first started playing the guitar at the age of eight. By the time he was a teenager, the Yugoslav Wars were raging and, although Montenegro was spared from direct conflict, its citizens were isolated from the rest of Europe. Despite all obstacles, the 17-year-old Miloš successfully applied for a scholarship at the Royal Academy of Music by sending a video tape he recorded at home and moved to London in September 2000, where he has continued to live ever since while keeping close ties with his family and homeland.

Kara (dark) dağ (mountain) means Montenegro in Turkish. Karadaglić is the Slavic form of the Turkish surname (Karadağlı) meaning a person from Montenegro.

Career
His debut album Mediterráneo (titled The Guitar for the U.K. market) was released in April 2011, topping the classical charts around the world and turning him into “classical music’s guitar hero” (the Telegraph). The album stayed #1 in the U.K. classical chart for 28 weeks, earning him both the prestigious Gramophone Young Artist of the Year  and Echo Klassik Newcomer of the Year awards. In 2012, he was named Classic BRIT MasterCard Breakthrough Artist of the Year for his second release  Latino. Gramophone, reviewing the record, commented: "Karadaglić is a guitarist of superior musical and technical gifts who allows his personality to sing through the music with taste and intelligence". Geoffrey Norris of The Daily Telegraph said: "The playing is lithe, subtle of timbre and transcendentally beautiful."

2012 was a breakthrough year on the concert stage for Miloš, with sold-out debut performances and tours in the UK, France, Netherlands, Switzerland, USA, Canada, Korea, Japan, Hong Kong and Australia. "Part of the reason Karadaglić has such a large following" commented The West Australian, "is his ability to straddle both hardcore classical and pop classical camps."  This was echoed by the London press following his celebrated Royal Albert Hall debut of which  The Guardian commented: "More extraordinary by far, however, was the way a single guitarist, playing an intimate and understated set, and equipped with a single microphone and some clever lighting, could shrink the Hall's cavernous space into something so close." The Independent concluded: “Defying its many critics to offer a dramatic and rounded evening of classical music, the guitar itself was the breakout star here – a sleight of hand that makes Karadaglić not only a magician, but a serious and accomplished musician”.

Miloš’ passion for the guitar is matched with an intuitive sense of how to bring the instrument across to his public – whether it be for an audience of 4000 in the Royal Albert Hall or an intimate chamber music performance for 100 people. He enjoys performing in the major concert halls as much as in non traditional venues such as New York's Le Poisson Rouge, London's Camden Roundhouse (iTunes Festival) and Deutsche Grammophon's Yellow Lounge club nights in London, Berlin, Amsterdam and Seoul.

Miloš's 2013 schedule included recital tours of UK, US, Germany and Japan as well as concerto performances with the world's leading orchestras. His schedule remains as challenging and exciting as ever; performances with the Royal Scottish National Orchestra, the London Philharmonic, English Chamber Orchestra, Hong Kong Philharmonic, Bangkok Symphony and NHK Symphony Orchestra (Japan) feature alongside recitals from Boston to Berkeley, Taipei to Turin and other appearances such as at the esteemed Verbier International Music Festival in Switzerland to which he regularly returns. In 2013, amongst many other concerts, he had a solo recital in Prague at the Prague Spring International Music Festival and in 2015 he was given a large ovation at the Czech Philharmonic New Year's Concert in Rudolfinum, Prague.

The success of Latino/Pasión has led to a new 2013 release entitled Latino GOLD featuring thirty minutes of newly recorded tracks from a wealth of Latin America-inspired music. Sergio Assad created arrangements for some of the key tracks on the album.

The 2014 DG recording of Rodrigo's most famous concertos with Yannick Nezet-Seguin and the London Philharmonic Orchestra had the Sunday Times calling him “The King of Aranjuez”, while “Blackbird- the Beatles album” (2016) was received with unanimous critical acclaim.  Recorded in the famous Abbey Road Studio 2, it features classic Beatles songs performed in innovative new arrangements by Sérgio Assad and includes collaborations with the jazz legend Gregory Porter, pop singer Tori Amos, cellist Steven Isserlis and sitar superstar Anoushka Shankar.

Miloš is a patron of the Mayor of London’s Fund for Young Musicians and the charity Awards for Young Musicians.

In 2018 Miloš launched a new series of 4 classical guitar method books published by Schott Music, titled "Play Guitar with Miloš", where he teaches classical guitar through the pieces he has played and enjoyed throughout his career.

Miloš uses D'Addario J46 strings and a 2007 guitar by Greg Smallman, kindly lent to him by Paul and Jenny Gillham.

Hand problem and recovery
On 18 October 2016, Miloš announced via Facebook that he would be temporarily withdrawing from public performances owing to a problem with his hand. One year later, in November 2017 it was announced via Norman Lebrecht's blog that he would slowly return to performing in spring 2018, amongst other things with two guitar concertos composed for him due to be premiered in the following season.

His injury was partly caused by burnout. In 2021 he said of the experience: "I feel like a winner because I came out the other side of it. I think it made me into a better human being and also a better artist, and I wouldn't change that experience for anything in the world."

Discography

Others
2013: Latino GOLD
2019: Sound Of Silence
2021: The Moon & The Forest

References

External links
Official website
Mercury Classics Miloš profile page
IMG Artists Miloš artist page
Deutsche Grammophon Miloš artist page

1983 births
21st-century guitarists
Alumni of the Royal Academy of Music
Classical guitarists
Living people
Montenegrin classical musicians